KRYK (101.3 FM, "Sunny 101") is a radio station licensed to serve Chinook, Montana.  The station is owned by New Media Broadcasters, Inc. It airs a hot adult contemporary music format. The broadcast studios are located north of Havre, at 2210 31st Street North. This facility is shared with its sister stations. The transmitter site is 13.7 miles SSW from Chinook.

Their HD2 channel carries a Current Hit Radio format.

The station was assigned the KRYK call letters by the Federal Communications Commission on July 25, 1983.

References

External links
KRYK official website
New Media Broadcasters Inc.

RYK
Hot adult contemporary radio stations in the United States
Blaine County, Montana
1983 establishments in Montana